Gurteen Beach (Trá na Feadóige in Irish meaning beach of the plover), located in Roundstone, County Galway, in the Connemara region of the west of Ireland, lies back-to-back with Dog's Bay. The two beaches were formed by a sand spit and tombolo which now separates the two bays known as Gurteen Bay and Dog's Bay. The name Gurteen derives from the Irish Goirtín meaning small plot or small field.

The area is internationally important for its rare and interesting ecological, geological and archaeological features. The sand and grassland habitats are of particular interest. The sand was not formed from rocks, but rather from shells of tiny sea creatures known as foraminifera. The grasslands, made up of machair vegetation is considered rare and only known to be found on the west coast of Ireland and Scotland.

The Roundstone beaches are also important as an example of practical community led nature conservation. The area had been seriously threatened by erosion up until the early 1990s. However, extensive efforts on behalf of the local beach restoration committee and local community have helped to re-establish the sand dunes on the tombolo and the headland and to preserve the very special character of the area.

External links 
Roundstone.ie

Beaches of County Galway
Conservation in the Republic of Ireland
Tombolos